Liberation Time is a studio album by British jazz guitarist John McLaughlin. The album was recorded in various locations and released on 16 July 2021 via Abstract Logix. The album's personnel includes members of McLaughlin’s current ensemble named 4th Dimension: Gary Husband on drums and piano, Etienne Mbappé on bass, Ranjit Barot on drums and Konokol vocals—in addition to invited musicians.

Reception
Michael Ullman of The Arts Fuse stated, "The disc is his defiant, even occasionally joyous, response to the Covid lockdown. In his notes, the guitarist is determined to be positive." Elliot Marlow-Stevens of Jazz Journal wrote, "Drawn from inspiration found during the isolation of the coronavirus pandemic, McLaughlin’s latest album demonstrates his enduring skill as one of fusion’s most important figures." James Hale of DownBeat commented, "A sub-40-minute John McLaughlin recording that includes two solo piano tracks by the leader is bound to be frustrating. Add a pair of band recordings that echo vintage Mahavishnu Orchestra rave-ups, one of which includes a guitar solo filled with ridiculous technique, and you have a recipe for considering what might have been."

Track listing

Personnel
John McLaughlin – guitar
Etienne Mbappe – bass
Jérôme Regard – bass
Sam Burgess – bass
Gary Husband – drums, keyboards
Nicolas Viccaro – drums
Vinnie Colaiuta – drums
Jean-Michel Aublette – drums, bass
Ranjit Barot – drums, vocals
Oz Ezzeldin – piano
Roger Rossignol – piano
Julian Siegel – tenor saxophone

References

External links

2021 albums
John McLaughlin (musician) albums